Frank Evans may refer to:

Arts and entertainment
 Frank Evans (actor) (1849–1934), American silent film actor
 Frank Howel Evans (1867–1931), Welsh story paper author
 Frank Evans (guitarist) (1930–2007), British jazz guitarist

Sports
 Frank Evans (rugby) (1897–1972), Welsh dual-code rugby player
 Frank Evans (baseball) (1921–2012), American Negro league baseball player
 Frank Evans (athlete) (born 1925), British Olympic athlete
 Frank Evans (bullfighter) (born 1942), British-born bullfighter

Others
 Frank Evans (general) (1876–1941), United States Marine Corps general
 Frank V. Evans, mayor of Birmingham, Alabama
 Thomas David Frank Evans (1917–1996), known as Frank Evans, British prisoner of war in World War II and author
 Frank Evans (politician) (1923–2010), U.S. Representative from Colorado

Other uses
 USS Frank E. Evans, 1944 destroyer named for the US Marine Corps general
 Frank Evans High School, historic building in Spartanburg County, South Carolina

See also 
 Francis Evans (disambiguation)